Will Montgomery (born February 13, 1983) is a former American football center that played ten seasons in the National Football League (NFL). He was drafted by the Carolina Panthers in the seventh round of the 2006 NFL Draft. He played college football at Virginia Tech.

Montgomery has also played for the New York Jets, Washington Redskins, Denver Broncos, and Chicago Bears.

Early years
Montgomery attended Centreville High School in Clifton, Virginia and was a letterman in football, basketball, and baseball.  In football, he won All-State honors as a senior defensive tackle.

Professional career
In Montgomery's career, he has started in 54 contests as a center, 10 at right guard and 7 at left guard.

Carolina Panthers
Montgomery was drafted by the Carolina Panthers in the 7th round (234th overall) of the 2006 NFL Draft. He played a total of six games in the 2006 NFL season. The Panthers waived Montgomery on September 2, 2007.

New York Jets
Montgomery signed with the New York Jets on September 19, 2007. He was waived by the Jets on September 25, but re-signed on September 29, 2008. Montgomery was waived again on October 14, 2008.

Washington Redskins

2008 season
Montgomery signed with the Washington Redskins on December 9, 2008, but saw no playing time in 2008 season.

2009 season
In the 2009 season, he played in all 16 games, but had only three starts as right guard.

2010 season
The Redskins re-signed Montgomery on March 13, 2010. In the 2010 season, he played a total of 13 games and was the starting right guard for the last six games of the season.

2011 season
In the 2011 season, Montgomery was moved from his original position of right guard to center. Although he became the starting center, he was moved to left guard after Kory Lichtensteiger suffered a torn ACL in Week 6. In Week 9 against the San Francisco 49ers, Montgomery moved back to center after Maurice Hurt took over as left guard. At the end of the season, he started in all 16 games for the first time in his entire career.

2012 season

Originally scheduled to be an unrestricted free agent in the 2012 season, Montgomery was re-signed by the Redskins to a four-year, $12 million contract. After the NFL cut $36 million from the Redskins' combined salary cap of the next two years, the Redskins restructured Montgomery's contract so $2 million of cap space was gained on March 16, 2012.

In the Week 13 game against the New York Giants, Montgomery jumped into a pile-on in an attempt to recover the ball that Alfred Morris fumbled. Linval Joseph tried to pull Montgomery out by yanking on his leg, but he reacted by kicking him in the groin. Joseph then stomped on Montgomery's stomach. On December 7, Montgomery was fined $10,000 for the incident. Late in the Week 15 game against the Cleveland Browns, he left the game after a player on the Browns team fell on his leg. The next day it was confirmed that he suffered a Grade 2 MCL sprain in his left leg. Montgomery was able to start in the next game against the Philadelphia Eagles.

2013 season
Montgomery returned as the Redskins' starting center and not only started every game, but he played every snap.

On March 14, 2014, the Redskins informed Montgomery he was being released, saving the team $1.92 million in salary cap room.

Denver Broncos
On April 1, 2014, the Denver Broncos and Montgomery agreed to terms on a one-year contract. Montgomery started the final 8 games at center, helping Denver rank 8th in rushing yards (1,032) in the second half of the season.

Chicago Bears
On April 2, 2015 Montgomery and the Chicago Bears agreed to terms on a  one-year contract. On October 5, 2015, Montgomery was placed on Injury Reserve.

Personal
After retiring from football, Montgomery lost roughly around 80 pounds by December 2017.

References

External links

Chicago Bears bio
Denver Broncos bio
Washington Redskins bio
Virginia Tech Hokies bio

1983 births
Living people
People from Brunswick, Maine
Players of American football from Virginia
Sportspeople from Fairfax County, Virginia
American football centers
American football offensive guards
Virginia Tech Hokies football players
Carolina Panthers players
New York Jets players
Washington Redskins players
Denver Broncos players
Chicago Bears players